Jana Nayaka is a 1988 Indian Kannada action drama directed by H. R. Bhargava, jointly produced by Bhargava and Rajaram, edited by Victor, starring Vishnuvardhan, Bhavya and Sudheer in the lead roles with Doddanna, Devaraj, Mukhyamantri Chandru, Ramesh Bhat,  Sundar Krishna Urs, K. S. Ashwath, Rajanand and Umashree in the supporting roles. The Rajan–Nagendra duo composed and scored the film's soundtrack.

Plot
Janardhan's father is murdered by a group of criminals while trying to expose them. Enraged, Janardhan sets out to avenge his father's death.

Cast
Vishnuvardhan as Janardhan
Bhavya as Shanthi
Sudheer as Veerabhadriah (Veerabhadru)
Doddanna as Nugeerappa
Devaraj as Narasimha
Mukhyamantri Chandru as Pampayya (Pampu)
Ramesh Bhat as Shivu
Sundar Krishna Urs as Secretary Seenu
K. S. Ashwath 
Rajanand
Umashree as Paari

Soundtrack
The songs was composed by Rajan–Nagendra.

References

External links 
 

1988 films
1980s Kannada-language films